{{DISPLAYTITLE:C12H10N2O}}
The molecular formula C12H10N2O (molar mass: 198.22 g/mol) may refer to:

 Azoxybenzene
 Harmol
 N-Nitrosodiphenylamine
 Norharmine
 Solvent Yellow 7